Perdita Durango, released as Dance with the Devil in the United States, is a 1997 action-crime-horror film directed by Álex de la Iglesia, based on Barry Gifford's 1992 novel 59° and Raining: The Story of Perdita Durango. It stars Rosie Perez as the title character and Javier Bardem. It is a Spain–United States–Mexico coproduction.

Plot 
Perdita Durango (Rosie Perez) has gone to Mexico to scatter the ashes of her dead sister. There, she is picked up by bank-robbing drug dealer Romeo Dolorosa (Javier Bardem). Dolorosa had robbed the bank to pay off his debt to loan shark "Catalina" (Demián Bichir). He also engages in scams in which he pretends to be a Santeria priest and hacks up corpses while snorting cocaine.

Romeo's latest scam is working for gangster Mr. Santos (Don Stroud) transporting refrigerated human fetuses to Las Vegas where they will be used to make cosmetic moisturizer.

Perdita devises a plan that they should capture a gringo and eat him as part of Romeo's ceremonies. They kidnap randomly chosen geeky college student Dwayne (Harley Cross) and his girlfriend Estelle (Aimee Graham). First, Perdita rapes Dwayne while Romeo rapes Estelle. They hold a ceremony to sacrifice Estelle while they force Dwayne to watch. Before the girl can be killed the sacrifice is interrupted by a gang of men led by Shorty Dee (Santiago Segura), a betrayed former partner of Romeo.

Romeo and Perdita escape with Dwayne and Estelle still their captives. The four go to the meeting with Santos' people to pick up the truckload of fetuses. Unfortunately, the hand-off is interrupted by drug enforcement agent Woody Dumas (James Gandolfini). Santos' men are all killed. Romeo escapes and drives to Vegas with Dwayne, while Perdita follows with Estelle.

On the trip, Romeo finds out his grandmother's house was raided by some of Catalina's men as punishment for Romeo's unpaid debt. Romeo visits Catalina in a club, pretending to offer Estelle as payment. When he gets Catalina alone, Romeo kills him.

Romeo, Perdita, Dwayne and Estelle finally get to Vegas. However, Dumas has been following them all the way. Moreover, the drop has become a trap for Romeo; Santos is upset about all the deaths at the pick-up so he has hired Romeo's cousin Reggie (Carlos Bardem) to kill Romeo.

Romeo and his one-armed ex-marine buddy Doug go to the drop, tipped off about the double-cross. Romeo leaves Perdita to watch the hostages, but Perdita's nervousness overcomes her. She lets Estelle and Dwayne go so she can check on her lover.

Reggie kills Doug and Perdita arrives just in time to see Reggie shoot Romeo in the back, killing him. Perdita shoots and kills Reggie and then flees as the cops bust in, led by Dumas, intending to arrest the men but instead finding them all dead.

Alone now, Perdita walks the Las Vegas strip mourning Romeo.

Versions 
The original Spanish version runs 10 minutes longer and features more sex and violence and ends with some characters digitally morphing into the scene finale from Vera Cruz.

The film is available in the United States on VHS/DVD in two versions: the edited 115 min. R-rated version and a 121 min. unrated version. Both of these are shorter than the Spanish version which has gotten a Blu-ray release in the United States.

Cast

Awards and nominations 

|-
| rowspan = "4" align = "center" | 1998 || rowspan = "4" | 12th Goya Awards || Best Production Supervision || José Luis Escolar ||  || rowspan = "4" | 
|-
| Best Original Score || Simon Boswell ||  
|-
| Best Costume Design || María Estela Fernández, Glenn Ralston || 
|-
| Best Makeup and Hairstyles || José Quetglás, Mercedes Guillot || 
|}

References 
Citations

Bibliography

External links 

1990s English-language films
1990s Spanish films
1990s Spanish-language films
1990s comedy horror films
1990s comedy road movies
1990s crime comedy films
1997 comedy films
1997 films
1997 multilingual films
Films based on horror novels
Films directed by Álex de la Iglesia
Films scored by Simon Boswell
Films set in Mexico
Films set in the United States
Films with screenplays by Jorge Guerricaechevarría
Spanish black comedy films
Spanish crime comedy films
Spanish multilingual films
Spanish road movies